The Albatros Dr. I was a German fighter triplane derivative of the D.V fitted with three pairs of wings instead of two. Identical in most other respects to the D.V, in the summer of 1917 it was flown side by side with the existing biplane in comparison trials. There was no discernible performance advantage and development was halted at the prototype stage.

Specifications

Notes

References

 Gray, P. and Thetford, O. German Aircraft of the First World War. London: Putnam, 1962
 Green, W. & Swanborough, G. The Complete Book of Fighters. London: Salamander Books, 1994 

Single-engined tractor aircraft
1910s German fighter aircraft
Military aircraft of World War I
Dr.I
Triplanes
Aircraft first flown in 1917